Richard Broadley Sibson (27 May 1911 – 13 July 1994) was a notable New Zealand teacher and ornithologist. He was born in Cliffe, Kent, England in 1911.

References

1911 births
1994 deaths
New Zealand schoolteachers
British emigrants to New Zealand
New Zealand ornithologists
20th-century New Zealand zoologists
People from Cliffe, Kent